Tobin Township is an inactive township in Scotland County, in the U.S. state of Missouri.

Tobin Township was erected in 1890, taking its name from Tobin Creek.

References

Townships in Missouri
Townships in Scotland County, Missouri